Jean-Louis Tulou (born 12 September 1786 in Paris – died 23 July 1865 in Nantes) was a French flute teacher and player, composer, and instrument maker.

Family and life 
His father, Louis-Prosper Tulou (1749–1799), was a bassoonist in the Paris Opera and professor at the Paris Conservatoire from 1795 until his death.

Jean-Louis studied at the Paris Conservatoire from the age of 10. He became a professor there in 1829 and remained until 1856. He was involved in flute manufacture. He died on 23 July 1865 in Nantes.

List of compositions

Flute method
"Méthode de Flûte", published 1835 (Paris) includes flute duets etc.

Piccolo method
Metodo Populare (Popular Method)

Flute and piano
Note: arrangements may exist for quartet/orchestra as well as with piano.
Air Varie, Op. 22
Air Ecossais - Fantaisie Brillante Op.29
Fantasie, Op. 30
Air Varie, Op. 35
Fantasie, Op. 36
L'Angelus Fantaisie, Op. 46
Welsh Air and Variations on "All Through The Night" Op. 48
Air Varie, Op. 62
Grand Solo No. 1
Grand Solo No. 2 Op. 70
Air Varie, Op. 73
Grand Solo No. 3 Op. 74
Grand Solo No. 4 Op. 77
Grand Solo No. 5 Op. 79
Grand Solo No. 6 Op. 82
Grand Solo No. 7 Op. 86
Grand Solo No. 8
Grand Solo No. 9
Grand Solo No. 10 Op. 92
Grand Solo No. 11 Op. 93
Grand Solo No. 12 Op. 94
Grand Solo No. 13 Op. 96
Grand Solo No. 14 Op. 97
Grand Solo No. 15
Grand Duo Brilliant - La Donna Del Lago, Op. 154
3 Italian Arias

Flute d'Amour and piano
Fantasy on a theme of Caraffa

Flute(s) and guitar
Six Airs Italiens. Transcription by Jean-Louis Tulou and Ferdinando Carulli

Two flutes
3 Duos Facile (3 Easy Duets), Op. 1
3 Duos Concertante, Op. 2
3 Sonates Pour deux Flutes, Op. 8
3 Duos Faciles (3 Easy Duets), Op. 11
3 Duos Dificiles, Op. 12
3 Duos, Op. 14 (D, e, A)
3 Duos Dificiles, Op. 15
3 Duos, Op. 18
3 Grand Duos Concertante, Op. 19 (G, Eb, g)
3 Grand Duos, Op. 31
3 Duos, Op. 33 (G, D, A)
3 Duos Concertante Op. 34 (C, D, G)
3 Grand Duos, Op. 72 (D, C, D)
Theme Varie, Op. 89
3 Duos Faciles (3 Easy Duets), Op. 102
3 Duos Faciles (3 Easy Duets), Op. 103
3 Duos, Op. 104

Three flutes
Grand Trio Op. 24 in E♭ Major
Trio Op. 26
Recollections Of Ireland, Op. 50
Souvenir Anglais Op. 51
Trio - "Les trios amis", Op. 65 in F Major
Trio Op. 83 in A Major

Five flute concertos
Concerto No. 1
Concerto No. 2
Concerto No. 3 Op. 10 in D Major
Concerto No. 4
Concerto No. 5 Op. 37

Sources
Great Flute Makers of France, Tula Gianini (Tony Bingham, London, 1993).
My Complete Story of the Flute, Leonardo De Lorenzo 
Flute repertoire catalogue: 10,000 titles. Frans Vester. London: Musica Rara, 1967

External links
 
 Biography at flutehistory.com
 Timeline at flutepage.de

1786 births
1865 deaths
Musicians from Paris
French classical flautists
French classical composers
French male classical composers
19th-century classical composers
Conservatoire de Paris alumni
Academic staff of the Conservatoire de Paris
19th-century French composers
19th-century French male musicians